Maxim Yuryevich Sushinsky (born July 1, 1974) is a Russian former professional ice hockey player. He played in the Kontinental Hockey League (KHL) and with the Minnesota Wild in the National Hockey League (NHL). His last name is sometimes transliterated as Sushinski or Sushinskiy.

Playing career
A skillful right winger, Maxim Sushinsky was drafted 132nd overall in the 2000 NHL Entry Draft by the Minnesota Wild and played 30 games with the Wild before leaving the team for personal and family reasons.

He has spent the majority of his career in playing in Russia, spending time with Avangard Omsk, HC Dynamo Moscow, and his current team SKA St. Petersburg in the Kontinental Hockey League.

He represented the Russian Federation in the 2006 Winter Olympics, where he had five points in eight games played. Throughout the event the nameplate on the back of his jersey had his name spelled "Sushinksky".

Career statistics

Regular season and playoffs

International

External links

1974 births
Living people
Avangard Omsk players
HC Dynamo Moscow players
HC Fribourg-Gottéron players
Ice hockey players at the 2006 Winter Olympics
Metallurg Magnitogorsk players
Minnesota Wild draft picks
Minnesota Wild players
Olympic ice hockey players of Russia
Russian ice hockey right wingers
Salavat Yulaev Ufa players
SKA Saint Petersburg players
Ice hockey people from Saint Petersburg
Toros Neftekamsk players